

Events

Pre-1600
 254 – Pope Stephen I succeeds Pope Lucius I, becoming the 23rd pope of the Catholic Church, and immediately takes a stand against Novatianism.
 907 – Zhu Wen forces Emperor Ai into abdicating, ending the Tang dynasty after nearly three hundred years of rule. 
1191 – Richard I of England marries Berengaria of Navarre in Cyprus; she is crowned Queen consort of England the same day.
1328 – Antipope Nicholas V, a claimant to the papacy, is consecrated in Rome by the Bishop of Venice.
1364 – Jagiellonian University, the oldest university in Poland, is founded in Kraków.
1497 – Pope Alexander VI excommunicates Girolamo Savonarola.
1510 – The Prince of Anhua rebellion begins when Zhu Zhifan kills all the officials invited to a banquet and declares his intent on ousting the powerful Ming dynasty eunuch Liu Jin during the reign of the Zhengde Emperor.
1551 – National University of San Marcos, the oldest university in the Americas, is founded in Lima, Peru.
1588 – French Wars of Religion: Henry III of France flees Paris after Henry I, Duke of Guise, enters the city and a spontaneous uprising occurs.
1593 – London playwright Thomas Kyd is arrested and tortured by the Privy Council for libel.

1601–1900
1743 – Maria Theresa of Austria is crowned Queen of Bohemia after defeating her rival, Charles VII, Holy Roman Emperor.
1778 – Heinrich XI, count of the Principality of Reuss-Greiz, is elevated to Prince by Joseph II, Holy Roman Emperor.
1780 – American Revolutionary War: In the largest defeat of the Continental Army, Charleston, South Carolina is taken by British forces.
1797 – War of the First Coalition: Napoleon Bonaparte conquers Venice.
1808 – Finnish War: Swedish-Finnish troops, led by Captain Karl Wilhelm Malmi, conquers the city of Kuopio from Russians after the Battle of Kuopio.
1821 – The first major battle of the Greek War of Independence against the Turks is fought in Valtetsi.
1846 – The Donner Party of pioneers departs Independence, Missouri for California, on what will become a year-long journey of hardship and cannibalism.
1862 – American Civil War: Union Army troops occupy Baton Rouge, Louisiana.
1863 – American Civil War: Battle of Raymond: Two divisions of James B. McPherson's XVII Corps turn the left wing of Confederate General John C. Pemberton's defensive line on Fourteen Mile Creek, opening up the interior of Mississippi to the Union Army during the Vicksburg Campaign.
1864 – American Civil War: The Battle of Spotsylvania Court House: Union troops assault a Confederate salient known as the "Mule Shoe", with some of the fiercest fighting of the war, much of it hand-to-hand combat, occurring at "the Bloody Angle" on the northwest.
1865 – American Civil War: The Battle of Palmito Ranch: The first day of the last major land action to take place during the Civil War, resulting in a Confederate victory.
1870 – The Manitoba Act is given the Royal Assent, paving the way for Manitoba to become a province of Canada on July 15.
1881 – In North Africa, Tunisia becomes a French protectorate.
1885 – North-West Rebellion: The four-day Battle of Batoche, pitting rebel Métis against the Canadian government, comes to an end with a decisive rebel defeat.
1888 – In Southeast Asia, the North Borneo Chartered Company's territories become the British protectorate of North Borneo.

1901–present
1926 – The Italian-built airship Norge becomes the first vessel to fly over the North Pole.
  1926   – The 1926 United Kingdom general strike ends. 
1932 – Ten weeks after his abduction, Charles Jr., the infant son of Charles Lindbergh, is found dead near Hopewell, New Jersey, just a few miles from the Lindberghs' home.
1933 – The Agricultural Adjustment Act, which restricts agricultural production through government purchase of livestock for slaughter and paying subsidies to farmers when they remove land from planting, is signed into law by President Franklin D. Roosevelt.
  1933   – President Roosevelt signs legislation creating the Federal Emergency Relief Administration, the predecessor of the Federal Emergency Management Agency. 
1937 – The Duke and Duchess of York are crowned as King George VI and Queen Elizabeth of the United Kingdom of Great Britain and Northern Ireland in Westminster Abbey.
1941 – Konrad Zuse presents the Z3, the world's first working programmable, fully automatic computer, in Berlin.
1942 – World War II: Second Battle of Kharkov: In eastern Ukraine, Red Army forces under Marshal Semyon Timoshenko launch a major offensive from the Izium bridgehead, only to be encircled and destroyed by the troops of Army Group South two weeks later.
1948 – Wilhelmina, Queen regnant of the Kingdom of the Netherlands, cedes the throne to her daughter Juliana.
1949 – Cold War: The Soviet Union lifts its blockade of Berlin.
1965 – The Soviet spacecraft Luna 5 crashes on the Moon.
1968 – Vietnam War: North Vietnamese and Viet Cong forces attack Australian troops defending Fire Support Base Coral.
1975 – Indochina Wars: Democratic Kampuchea naval forces capture the SS Mayaguez.
1978 – In Zaire, rebels occupy the city of Kolwezi, the mining center of the province of Shaba (now known as Katanga); the local government asks the US, France and Belgium to restore order.
1982 – During a procession outside the shrine of the Virgin Mary in Fátima, Portugal, security guards overpower Juan María Fernández y Krohn before he can attack Pope John Paul II with a bayonet.
1989 – The San Bernardino train disaster kills four people, only to be followed a week later by an underground gasoline pipeline explosion, which kills two more people.
1998 – Four students are shot at Trisakti University, leading to widespread riots and the fall of Suharto.
2002 – Former US President Jimmy Carter arrives in Cuba for a five-day visit with Fidel Castro, becoming the first President of the United States, in or out of office, to visit the island since the Cuban Revolution.
2003 – The Riyadh compound bombings in Saudi Arabia, carried out by al-Qaeda, kill 39 people.
2006 – Mass unrest by the Primeiro Comando da Capital begins in São Paulo (Brazil), leaving at least 150 dead.
  2006   – Iranian Azeris interpret a cartoon published in an Iranian magazine as insulting, resulting in massive riots throughout the country.
2008 – An earthquake (measuring around 8.0 magnitude) occurs in Sichuan, China, killing over 69,000 people.
  2008   – U.S. Immigration and Customs Enforcement conducts the largest-ever raid of a workplace in Postville, Iowa, arresting nearly 400 immigrants for identity theft and document fraud.
2010 – Afriqiyah Airways Flight 771 crashes on final approach to Tripoli International Airport in Tripoli, Libya, killing 103 out of the 104 people on board.
2015 – A train derailment in Philadelphia kills eight people and injures more than 200.
  2015   – Massive Nepal earthquake kills 218 people and injures more than 3500.
2017 – The WannaCry ransomware attack impacts over 400,000 computers worldwide, targeting computers of the United Kingdom's National Health Services and Telefónica computers.
2018 – Paris knife attack: A man is fatally shot by police in Paris after killing one and injuring several others.

Births

Pre-1600
1325 – Rupert II, Elector Palatine (d. 1398)
1401 – Emperor Shōkō of Japan (d. 1428)
1479 – Pompeo Colonna, Catholic cardinal (d. 1532)
1496 – Gustav I of Sweden (d. 1560)
1590 – Cosimo II de' Medici, Grand Duke of Tuscany (d. 1621)

1601–1900
1606 – Joachim von Sandrart, German art-historian and painter (d. 1688)
1622 – Louis de Buade de Frontenac, French-Canadian soldier and politician, third Governor General of New France (d. 1698)
1626 – Louis Hennepin, Flemish priest and missionary (d. 1705)
1670 – Augustus II the Strong, Polish king (d. 1733)
1700 – Luigi Vanvitelli, Italian architect and engineer, designed the Palace of Caserta and Royal Palace of Milan (d. 1773)
1725 – Louis Philippe I, Duke of Orléans (d. 1785)
1739 – Johann Baptist Wanhal, Czech-Austrian organist and composer (d. 1813)
1754 – Franz Anton Hoffmeister, German composer and publisher (d. 1812)
1755 – Giovanni Battista Viotti, Italian violinist and composer (d. 1824)
1767 – Manuel Godoy, Spanish field marshal and politician, Prime Minister of Spain (d. 1851)
1774 – Ellis Cunliffe Lister, English politician (d. 1853)
1777 – Mary Reibey, Australian businesswoman (d. 1855)
1803 – Justus von Liebig, German chemist and academic (d. 1873)
1804 – Robert Baldwin, Canadian lawyer and politician, third Premier of West Canada (d. 1858)
1806 – Johan Vilhelm Snellman, Finnish philosopher and politician (d. 1881)
1812 – Edward Lear, English poet and illustrator (d. 1888)
1814 – Adolf von Henselt, German pianist and composer (d. 1889)
1820 – Florence Nightingale, Italian-English nurse, social reformer, and statistician (d. 1910)
1825 – Orélie-Antoine de Tounens, French lawyer and explorer (d. 1878)
1828 – Dante Gabriel Rossetti, English poet and painter (d. 1882)
1829 – Pavlos Carrer, Greek composer and educator (d. 1896)
1839 – Tôn Thất Thuyết, Vietnamese mandarin (d. 1913)
1840 – Alejandro Gorostiaga, Chilean colonel (d. 1912)
1842 – Jules Massenet, French composer (d. 1912)
1845 – Gabriel Fauré, French pianist, composer, and educator (d. 1924)
1850 – Henry Cabot Lodge, American historian and politician (d. 1924)
  1850   – Frederick Holder, Australian politician, 19th Premier of South Australia (d. 1909)
1859 – William Alden Smith, American lawyer and politician (d. 1932)
  1859   – Frank Wilson, English-Australian politician, ninth Premier of Western Australia (d. 1918)
1863 – Upendrakishore Ray Chowdhury, Bengali writer, painter, violin player and composer, technologist and entrepreneur (d. 1915)
1867 – Hugh Trumble, Australian cricketer and accountant (d. 1938)
1869 – Carl Schuhmann, German gymnast, wrestler, and weightlifter (d. 1946)
1872 – Anton Korošec, Slovenian priest and politician, tenth Prime Minister of Yugoslavia (d. 1940)
1873 – J. E. H. MacDonald, English-Canadian painter (d. 1932)
1874 – Clemens von Pirquet, Austrian pediatrician and immunologist (d. 1929)
1875 – Charles Holden, English architect, designed the Bristol Central Library (d. 1960)
1880 – Lincoln Ellsworth, American explorer (d. 1951)
1885 – Paltiel Daykan, Lithuanian-Israeli lawyer and jurist (d. 1969)
  1885   – Saneatsu Mushanokōji, Japanese author (d. 1976)
1886 – Ernst A. Lehmann, German captain and pilot (d. 1937)
1889 – Abelardo L. Rodríguez, substitute president of Mexico (d. 1967)
  1889   – Otto Frank, German-Swiss businessman and Holocaust survivor; father of diarist Anne Frank (d. 1980)
1892 – Fritz Kortner, Austrian-German actor and director (d. 1970)
1895 – William Giauque, Canadian-American chemist and academic, Nobel Prize laureate (d. 1982)
  1895   – Jiddu Krishnamurti, Indian-American philosopher and author (d. 1986)
1900 – Helene Weigel, Austrian-German actress (d. 1971)

1901–present
1901 – The Duke of Paducah, American country comedian, radio host and banjo player (d. 1986) 
1903 – Faith Bennett, British actress and ATA pilot during WWII (d. 1969) 
  1903   – Wilfrid Hyde-White, English actor (d. 1991)
1905 – Édouard Rinfret, Canadian lawyer and politician, Postmaster General of Canada (d. 1994)
1907 – Leslie Charteris, English author and screenwriter (d. 1993)
  1907   – Katharine Hepburn, American actress (d. 2003)
1908 – Nicholas Kaldor, Hungarian-English economist (d. 1986)
1910 – James Dudley, American baseball player, wrestling manager and executive (d. 2004)
  1910   – Johan Ferrier, Surinamese educator and politician, first President of Suriname (d. 2010)
  1910   – Dorothy Hodgkin, English biochemist, crystallographer, and academic, Nobel Prize laureate (d. 1994) 
  1910   – Gordon Jenkins, American pianist and composer (d. 1984)
1911 – Charles Biro, American author and illustrator (d. 1972)
1912 – Henry Jonsson, Swedish runner (d. 2001)
1914 – Bertus Aafjes, Dutch poet and author (d. 1993)
  1914   – Howard K. Smith, American journalist and actor (d. 2002)
1915 – Tony Strobl, American comics artist and animator (d. 1991)
1916 – Albert Murray, American author and critic (d. 2013)
1918 – Mary Kay Ash, American businesswoman, founded Mary Kay Cosmetics (d. 2001)
  1918   – Julius Rosenberg, American spy (d. 1953)
1921 – Joseph Beuys, German sculptor and illustrator (d. 1986)
  1921   – Farley Mowat, Canadian environmentalist and author (d. 2014)
  1921   – Lily Renée, American comic-book artist (d. 2022)
1922 – Marco Denevi, Argentinian lawyer and author (d. 1998)
  1922   – Murray Gershenz, American actor and businessman (d. 2013)
  1922   – Bob Goldham, Canadian ice hockey player and sportscaster (d. 1991)
  1922   – Roy Salvadori, English racing driver and manager (d. 2012) 
1924 – Maxine Cooper, American actress and photographer (d. 2009)
  1924   – Alexander Esenin-Volpin, Russian-American mathematician and poet (d. 2016)
  1924   – Tony Hancock, English actor, producer, and screenwriter (d. 1968)
1925 – Yogi Berra, American baseball player, coach, and manager (d. 2015)
1926 – Paulette Poujol-Oriol, Haitian educator and writer (d. 2011)
  1926   – Viren J. Shah, Indian politician, 21st Governor of West Bengal (d. 2013)
1928 – Burt Bacharach, American singer-songwriter, pianist, and producer (d. 2023)
1929 – Sam Nujoma, Namibian politician, first President of Namibia
  1929   – Dollard St. Laurent, Canadian ice hockey player (d. 2015)
1930 – Jesús Franco, Spanish director and screenwriter (d. 2013)
1932 – Joel Joffe, Baron Joffe, South African-English lawyer and politician (d. 2017)
1933 – Andrei Voznesensky, Russian poet (d. 2010)
1935 – Felipe Alou, Dominican-American baseball player, coach, and manager
  1935   – Johnny Bucyk, Canadian ice hockey player
1936 – Guillermo Endara, Panamanian lawyer and politician, 32nd President of Panama (d. 2009)
  1936   – Tom Snyder, American journalist and talk show host (d. 2007)
  1936   – Frank Stella, American painter and sculptor
1937 – Beryl Burton, English cyclist (d. 1996)
  1937   – George Carlin, American comedian, actor, and author (d. 2008)
  1937   – Susan Hampshire, English actress  
  1937   – Miriam Stoppard, English physician and author
1938 – Millie Perkins, American actress
1939 – Cyril Chantler, English pediatrician and academic
  1939   – Jalal Dabagh, Kurdish journalist and politician
  1939   – Miltiadis Evert, Greek minister and politician, 69th Mayor of Athens (d. 2011)
  1939   – Reg Gasnier, Australian rugby league player, coach, and sportscaster (d. 2014)
  1939   – Ron Ziegler, American politician, White House Press Secretary (d. 2003)
1940 – Norman Whitfield, American songwriter and producer (d. 2008)
1941 – Ruud de Wolff, Dutch singer (d. 2000)
1942 – Ian Dury, English singer-songwriter (d. 2000)
  1942   – Billy Swan,  American country singer-songwriter
  1942   – Dragoljub Velimirović, Serbian chess player and theoretician (d. 2014)
1944 – Chris Patten, English academic and politician, 28th Governor of Hong Kong
1945 – Alan Ball, Jr., English footballer and manager (d. 2007)
  1945   – Ian McLagan, English keyboard player and songwriter (d. 2014)
  1945   – Patrick Ricard, French businessman (d. 2012)
1946 – Daniel Libeskind, American architect, designed the Imperial War Museum North and Jewish Museum
1947 – Michael Ignatieff, Canadian journalist and politician
1948 – Lindsay Crouse, American actress
  1948   – Dave Heineman, American captain and politician, 39th Governor of Nebraska
  1948   – Richard Riehle, American actor
  1948   – Steve Winwood, English singer-songwriter and multi-instrumentalist
1949 – Ross Bleckner, American painter
1950 – Bruce Boxleitner, American actor and author
  1950   – Gabriel Byrne, Irish actor, director, and producer
  1950   – Helena Kennedy, Baroness Kennedy of The Shaws, Scottish lawyer, academic, and politician
  1950   – Billy Squier, American singer-songwriter and guitarist
1951 – George Karl, American basketball player and coach
1955 – Kix Brooks, American country music singer-songwriter and musician
1956 – Bernie Federko, Canadian ice hockey player, coach, and manager
  1956   – Sergio Marchi, Argentinean-Canadian urban planner and politician, tenth Canadian Minister of International Trade
  1956   – Greg Phillinganes, American keyboardist
  1956   – Asad Rauf, Pakistani cricketer and umpire
1957 – Ziya Onis, Turkish economist and academic
1958 – Kim Greist, American actress
1958 – Andreas Petroulakis, Greek cartoonist
  1958   – Dries van Noten, Belgian fashion designer
1959 – Ving Rhames, American actor
1960 – Lisa Martin, Australian runner
1961 – Thomas Dooley, German-American soccer player and manager
  1961   – Bruce McCulloch, Canadian actor and comedian
1962 – Emilio Estevez, American actor
  1962   – Brett Gurewitz, American guitarist and songwriter
  1962   – Gregory H. Johnson, English-born American astronaut
1963 – Panagiotis Fasoulas, Greek basketball player and politician
  1963   – Gavin Hood, South African actor, director, producer, and screenwriter
  1963   – Stefano Modena, Italian racing driver
  1963   – Vanessa A. Williams, American actress and producer
1964 – Pierre Morel, French director and cinematographer
1965 – Renée Simonsen, Danish model and writer
  1965   – Stacy Wilson, Canadian ice hockey player
1966 – Stephen Baldwin, American actor
  1966   – Bebel Gilberto, American-Brazilian singer-songwriter
  1966   – Deborah Kara Unger, Canadian actress
1967 – Mireille Bousquet-Mélou, French mathematician
  1967   – Bill Shorten, Australian politician
1968 – Tony Hawk, American skateboarder and actor
1969 – Suzanne Clément, Canadian actress
  1969   – Kim Fields, American actress
1970 – Mark Foster, English swimmer
  1970   – Jim Furyk, American golfer
  1970   – Samantha Mathis, American actress
  1970   – Mike Weir, Canadian golfer
  1970   – Raj Chandarlapaty, American educator and author
1971 – Doug Basham, American wrestler
  1971   – Jamie Luner, American actress
1972 – Christian Campbell, Canadian-American actor, writer and photographer
1973 – Mackenzie Astin, American actor
  1973   – Lutz Pfannenstiel, German footballer and manager
1975 – Jonah Lomu, New Zealand rugby player (d. 2015)
  1975   – Ricky Ortiz, American professional wrestler and football player
1977 – Graeme Dott, Scottish snooker player and coach
  1977   – Maryam Mirzakhani, Iranian mathematician (d. 2017) 
  1977   – Onur Saylak,  Turkish actor, filmmaker and director
  1977   – Rachel Wilson, Canadian actress and voice actress
  1977   – Mareile Höppner, German television presenter
1978 – Malin Åkerman, Swedish-Canadian model, actress, and singer
  1978   – Jason Biggs, American actor and comedian
  1978   – Aya Ishiguro, Japanese singer and fashion designer
1979 – Adrian Serioux, Canadian soccer player
1980 – Rishi Sunak, English politician
1981 – Rami Malek, American actor
  1981   – Kentaro Sato, Japanese-American composer and conductor 
1982 – Donnie Nietes, Filipino boxer
1983 – Domhnall Gleeson, Irish actor
  1983   – Alina Kabaeva, Russian gymnast and politician
  1983   – Yujiro Kushida, Japanese wrestler and mixed martial artist
  1983   – Charilaos Pappas, Greek footballer
  1983   – Virginie Razzano, French tennis player
  1983   – Francisco Javier Torres, Mexican footballer
1984 – Clare Bowen, Australian actress and singer
1985 – Paolo Goltz, Argentinian footballer
  1985   – Andrew Howe, Italian long jumper and sprinter
  1985   – Jeroen Simaeys, Belgian footballer
1986 – Jonathan Orozco, Mexican footballer
  1986   – Emily VanCamp, Canadian actress
1987 – Kieron Pollard, Trinidadian cricketer
1988 – Marcelo, Brazilian footballer
1989 – Eleftheria Eleftheriou, Greek Cypriot singer, musician, and actress
1990 – Florent Amodio, French figure skater
  1990   – Etika, American YouTuber and live streamer (d. 2019)
1992 – Volha Khudzenka, Belarusian kayaker
1995 – Tamara Korpatsch, German tennis player
1997 – Morgan Lake, English athlete
2003 – Madeleine Beth McCann, British missing person

Deaths

Pre-1600
 805 – Æthelhard, archbishop of Canterbury
 940 – Eutychius, patriarch of Alexandria (b. 877)
1003 – Sylvester II, pope of the Catholic Church (b. 946)
1012 – Sergius IV, pope of the Catholic Church (b. 970)
1090 – Liutold of Eppenstein, duke of Carinthia
1161 – Fergus of Galloway, Scottish nobleman 
1182 – Valdemar I, king of Denmark (b. 1131)
1331 – Engelbert of Admont, Benedictine abbot and scholar
1465 – Thomas Palaiologos, Despot of Morea (b. 1409)
1490 – Joanna, Portuguese princess and regent (b. 1452)
1529 – Cecily Bonville, 7th Baroness Harington, English noblewoman (b. 1460)
1599 – Murad Mirza, Mughal prince (b. 1570)

1601–1900
1634 – George Chapman, English poet and playwright (b. 1559)
1641 – Thomas Wentworth, 1st Earl of Strafford, English soldier and politician, Lord Lieutenant of Ireland (b. 1593)
1684 – Edme Mariotte, French physicist and priest (b. 1620)
1699 – Lucas Achtschellinck, Flemish painter (b. 1626)
1700 – John Dryden, English poet, playwright, and critic (b. 1631)
1708 – Adolphus Frederick II, duke of Mecklenburg-Strelitz (b. 1658)
1748 – Thomas Lowndes, English astronomer and academic (b. 1692)
1759 – Lambert-Sigisbert Adam, French sculptor (b. 1700)
1784 – Abraham Trembley, Swiss zoologist and academic (b. 1710)
1792 – Charles Simon Favart, French playwright and composer (b. 1710)
1796 – Johann Uz, German poet and author (b. 1720)
1801 – Nicholas Repnin, Russian general and politician, Governor-General of Baltic provinces (b. 1734)
1842 – Walenty Wańkowicz, Belarusian-Polish painter (b. 1799)
1845 – János Batsányi, Hungarian poet and academic (b. 1763)
1856 – Jacques Philippe Marie Binet, French mathematician, physicist, and astronomer (b. 1786)
1859 – Sergey Aksakov, Russian author and academic (b. 1791)
1860 – Charles Barry, English architect, designed Upper Brook Street Chapel and the Palace of Westminster (b. 1795)
1864 – J. E. B. Stuart, American general (b. 1833)
1867 – Friedrich Wilhelm Eduard Gerhard, German archaeologist and academic (b. 1795)
1878 – Anselme Payen, French chemist and academic (b. 1795)
1876 – Georgi Benkovski, Bulgarian activist (b. 1843)
1884 – Bedřich Smetana, Czech composer and educator (b. 1824)
1897 – Minna Canth, Finnish journalist, playwright, and activist (b. 1844)
1900 – Göran Fredrik Göransson, Swedish merchant, ironmaster and industrialist (b. 1819)

1901–present
1907 – Joris-Karl Huysmans, French author and critic (b. 1848)
1916 – James Connolly, Scottish-born Irish socialist and rebel leader (b. 1868) 
1925 – Amy Lowell, American poet and critic (b. 1874)
1931 – Eugène Ysaÿe, Belgian violinist, composer, and conductor (b. 1858)
1935 – Józef Piłsudski, Polish field marshal and politician, 15th Prime Minister of Poland (b. 1867)
1944 – Max Brand, American journalist and author (b. 1892)
  1944   – Arthur Quiller-Couch, English author, poet, and critic (b. 1863)
1956 – Louis Calhern, American actor and singer (b. 1895)
1957 – Alfonso de Portago, Spanish bobsledder and racing driver (b. 1928)
  1957   – Erich von Stroheim, Austrian-American actor, director, and producer (b. 1885)
1963 – Richard Girulatis, German footballer and manager (b. 1878)
  1963   – Robert Kerr, Irish-Canadian sprinter and coach (b. 1882)
1964 – Agnes Forbes Blackadder, Scottish medical doctor (b. 1875)
1966 – Felix Steiner, Russian-German SS officer (b. 1896)
1967 – John Masefield, English poet and author (b. 1878)
1970 – Nelly Sachs, German poet and playwright, Nobel Prize laureate (b. 1891)
1971 – Heinie Manush, American baseball player and coach (b. 1901)
1973 – Frances Marion, American screenwriter, novelist and journalist (b. 1888)
  1973   – Art Pollard, American race car driver (b. 1927)
1974 – Wayne Maki, Canadian National Hockey League player (b. 1944)
1980 – Lillian Roth, American actress (b. 1910)
1981 – Francis Hughes, Provisional IRA hunger striker (b. 1956) 
1981 – Benjamin Sheares, Singaporean professor and politician, second President of Singapore (b. 1907)
1985 – Jean Dubuffet, French painter and sculptor (b. 1901)
1986 – Elisabeth Bergner, German actress (b. 1897)
1992 – Nikos Gatsos, Greek poet and songwriter (b. 1911)
  1992   – Robert Reed, American actor (b. 1932)
1993 – Zeno Colò, Italian Olympic alpine skier (b.1920)
1994 – Erik Erikson, German-American psychologist and psychoanalyst (b. 1902)
  1994   – John Smith, Scottish-English lawyer and politician, Labour Party leader,  Leader of the Opposition (b. 1938) 
1995 – Ștefan Kovács, Romanian football player and coach (b. 1920)
1999 – Saul Steinberg, Romanian-American illustrator (b. 1914)
2000 – Adam Petty, American race car driver (b. 1980)
2001 – Perry Como, American singer and television host (b. 1912)
  2001   – Alexei Tupolev, Russian engineer, designed the Tupolev Tu-144 (b. 1925)
2003 – Prince Sadruddin Aga Khan, French-American diplomat (b. 1933)
2005 – Ömer Kavur, Turkish director, producer, and screenwriter (b. 1944)
  2005   – Martin Lings, English author and scholar (b. 1909)
  2005   – Monica Zetterlund, Swedish actress (b. 1937)
2006 – Hussein Maziq, Libyan politician, Prime Minister of Libya (b. 1918)
2008 – Robert Rauschenberg, American painter and illustrator (b. 1925)
  2008   – Irena Sendler, Polish nurse and humanitarian (b. 1910)
2009 – Antonio Vega, Spanish singer-songwriter and guitarist (b. 1957)
2012 – Jan Bens, Dutch footballer and coach (b. 1921)
  2012   – Eddy Paape, Belgian illustrator (b. 1920)
2013 – Gerd Langguth, German political scientist, author, and academic (b. 1946)
2014 – Cornell Borchers, Lithuanian-German actress and singer (b. 1925)
  2014   – Marco Cé, Italian cardinal (b. 1925)
  2014   – H. R. Giger, Swiss painter, sculptor, and set designer (b. 1940)
  2014   – Sarat Pujari, Indian actor, director, and screenwriter (b. 1934)
  2014   – Lorenzo Zambrano, Mexican businessman and philanthropist (b. 1944)
2015 – Peter Gay, German-American historian, author, and academic (b. 1923)
2016 – Mike Agostini, Trinidadian sprinter (b. 1935)
2017 – Mauno Koivisto, Finnish banker and politician, ninth President of Finland (b. 1923)
2018 – Dennis Nilsen, Scottish serial killer (b. 1945)

Holidays and observances
Christian feast day:
Blessed Imelda
Blessed Joan of Portugal
Crispoldus
Dominic de la Calzada
Epiphanius of Salamis
Gregory Dix (Church of England)
Modoald
Nereus, Achilleus, Domitilla, and Pancras
Patriarch Germanus I of Constantinople (Eastern Church)
Philip of Agira
International ME/CFS and Fibromyalgia Awareness Day

References

External links

 BBC: On This Day
 
 Historical Events on May 12

Days of the year
May